The 3rd Paratroopers Battalion is a military formation of the Belgian Land Component and part of the Special Operations Regiment. It carries on the regimental traditions of the Belgian Korean War volunteers.

Corps of Volunteers for Korea

After the outbreak of the Korean War in 1950, the United Nations asked the Belgian government for military assistance. Belgium, conscious of the vast cost and logistical difficulties of sending large numbers of men or equipment across the world, elected to put an elite unit under UN command.  Since the Belgian constitution forbade sending anyone but volunteers on overseas deployments in peacetime, it was not possible to send an existing battalion, so the Belgian United Nations Command (known as BUNC) was created. BUNC also incorporated a platoon of volunteer from Luxembourg. BUNC soldiers wore Brown Berets with a new cap badge to distinguish them from other Belgian units.

BUNC fought in several of the key engagements of the Korean War from 1951, including the Battle of the Imjin River, the Battle of Haktang-ni and the Battle of Chatkol. BUNC won Presidential Unit Citation (United States) and Presidential Unit Citation (Republic of Korea) for its heroism, and citations for these battles are included on the Regimental Standard. Of the 3,000 Belgian soldiers who served in Korea, over 100 were killed in action between the battalion's arrival in 1951 and the 1953 armistice. The last Belgian forces left Korea in 1955.

Major Operations

Congo

Somalia

Kosovo

Afghanistan

Niger

Peacekeeping

Somalia

In December 1992, 1st Paratroopers Battalion deployed to Somalia as part of US-led United Nations mission Operation Restore Hope. Their role involved protecting UN aid distribution, as well as searching out militants. The 3rd Paratroopers Battalion was later also deployed to the country.

In 1993, two soldiers of the 3rd Paratroopers Battalion were arrested, after a photo apparently showing two soldiers holding a Somali boy above a fire appeared in Belgian newspapers. Two soldiers were put on trial in Belgium, but both were acquitted by a military tribunal through lack of evidence.

Lebanon
Soldiers from 3rd Paratroopers Battalion have been deployed to peace-keep in Lebanon as part of the United Nations UNIFIL mission. The Belgian force, known as BELUBAT (since it is also joint with Luxembourg).

Composition
The battalion was bilingual (French-Dutch) from its creation until 1982, but is now Dutch speaking only.

The 3rd Paratrooper Battalion and the 2nd Commando Battalion personnel are all trained identically, and are designated as a  Paracommando's on completion of their training, Personnel allocated to the 3rd Paratrooper Battalion are awarded the Paratrooper Maroon Beret, and wear the Paratrooper Qualification Brevet above the right side chest Pocket along with Belgian "Commando Dagger" brevet on the upper right sleeve

Organisation

The 3rd Paratroopers Battalion comprises:
 
 Headquarters Company
 17th Paratroopers Company 
 22nd Paratroopers Company
The 21st Paratroopers Company was disbanded when the Special Operations Regiment was formed from the Light Brigade.

See also
King Philippe, a member of the battalion in 1983.

References

External links

Airborne units and formations of Belgium
Battalions of Belgium
Military units and formations established in 1950
1950 establishments in Belgium
Parachuting in Belgium